Tebellong Airport  is an airport serving the village of Tebellong in Qacha's Nek District, Lesotho.

See also
Transport in Lesotho
List of airports in Lesotho

References

External links
 OurAirports - Tebellong
 Tebellong Airport
 Google Earth

Airports in Lesotho